Guettarda is a plant genus in the family Rubiaceae. Most of these plants are known by the common name velvetseed. Estimates of the number of species range from about 50  to 162.  Most of the species are neotropical. Twenty are found in New Caledonia and one reaches Australia. A few others are found on islands and in coastal areas of the Indian and Pacific Oceans.

Three species (G. odorata, G. scabra, G. speciosa) are known in cultivation. Guettarda argentea provides edible fruit. The type species for the genus is Guettarda speciosa. It is grown as an ornamental.

Guettarda was named by Linnaeus in 1753 in his book Species Plantarum. This generic name is in honour of the 18th century French naturalist Jean-Étienne Guettard.

The genus Guettarda is much in need of revision. Molecular phylogenetic studies have found it to be several times polyphyletic with some of its clades paraphyletic over small genera.

Species
The following species list may be incomplete or contain synonyms.

References

External links
 Guettarda At: Search Page At: World Checklist of Rubiaceae At: Index by Team At: Projects At: Science Directory At: Scientific Research and Data At: Kew Gardens
 Guettarda In: Volume 2 Of: Species Plantarum At: Titles beginning with "S" At: Biodiversity Heritage Library
 Guettarda At: Index Nominum Genericorum At: References At: NMNH Department of Botany At: Research and Collections At: Smithsonian National Museum of Natural History
 Guettarda At: Guettardeae At: Cinchonoideae At: Rubiaceae In: ··· Embryophyta At: Streptophytina At: Streptophyta At: Viridiplantae At: Eudaryota At: Taxonomy At: UniProt
 Guettarda At: Annotated Checklist of Cultivated Plants of Hawaii At: Botany Databases At: HBS Databases At: HBS At: Research and Collections  At: Bishop Museum

 
Rubiaceae genera
Taxa named by Carl Linnaeus
Taxonomy articles created by Polbot